Tobit John "Tobi" Brown (born 8 April 1993), better known as TBJZL, is an English YouTuber, streamer and Internet personality. He is also a member and co-founder of the British YouTube group known as the Sidemen.

In 2019, Brown was listed as the 38th most influential online creator in the United Kingdom by The Sunday Times. , his main YouTube channel has over 4.9 million subscribers and 524 million video views. Brown has also released music mononymously, and in 2020, he released his debut single "Destined for Greatness", which peaked at number 31 on the UK Singles Chart and number 33 on the Irish Singles Chart.

Early life 
Tobit John Brown was born on 8 April 1993 in Hackney, London to a working-class family of Nigerian heritage. Brown attended St. Dominic's Catholic Primary School from 1997 until 2004, and then attended Bexley Grammar School, where he met future fellow Sidemen member Josh Bradley. Brown later completed an honours degree in computing at Coventry University.

Career 
Brown joined YouTube in 2011 while at university after he saw Bradley gaining traction on the platform and then decided to become a full-time YouTuber after university. He uploads video game commentaries, most notably of the FIFA and NBA 2K video game series, as well as football challenges, vlogs, and comedy style videos.

On 19 October 2013, Brown and four other British YouTubers formed the entertainment collective Ultimate Sidemen, later shortened to simply Sidemen. Since 2014, the group has consisted of seven British YouTubers: Vikram Barn (Vikkstar123), Joshua Bradley (Zerkaa), Harry Lewis (W2S), Simon Minter (Miniminter), JJ Olatunji (KSI), Ethan Payne (Behzinga), and Tobi Brown. The group produces online videos, most often consisting of challenges, sketches and video-game commentary, as well as selling exclusive Sidemen merchandise.

In June 2018, Brown founded a streetwear brand called ILLVZN with the official launch in February 2019. In May 2019, he collaborated with New Era Cap to release a custom 9Fifty snapback. That September, he was listed as the 38th most influential online creator in the United Kingdom by The Sunday Times. In December, he released "The Gift" with the rest of the Sidemen, reaching number 77 on the UK Singles Chart.

Brown released his debut single, "Destined for Greatness", with his brother Manny featuring his sister Janellé on 7 February 2020. The song charted at number 31 on the UK Singles Chart, making it Brown's first UK top 40 single. Elsewhere, "Destined for Greatness" debuted at number 18 in New Zealand and on the Scottish Singles Chart, and peaked at number 33 on the Irish Singles Chart. He later featured in a remix of his fellow Sidemen member KSI's song "Wake Up Call" by producer Yoshi with American rapper Trippie Redd and British rapper P Money, which was released on 6 March 2020. Brown featured on "This Year" by P Money and producer Silencer, which was released on 19 March 2021. Brown released his second single "Rhythm & Vibes", also with his brother Manny, on 20 August 2021. In March 2022, he featured in rapper DTG's song "Just Do It".

Personal life 
Brown is a supporter of Manchester United F.C. and plays Sunday league football for Under The Radar FC, a team formed by his brother and fellow YouTuber Manny Brown. He has spoken out on racism within football with Sky Sports News.

Filmography

Discography

Singles

As lead artist

As a featured artist

Other charted songs

References

External links 
 
 

1993 births
Alumni of Coventry University
Black British male rappers
English male rappers
English male web series actors
English male writers
English people of Nigerian descent
Gaming YouTubers
Living people
Music YouTubers
People educated at Bexley Grammar School
Rappers from London
Twitch (service) streamers
Video game commentators
YouTube channels launched in 2011
YouTube vloggers
YouTubers from London
English YouTubers